The fifteenth season of Dancing with the Stars premiered on the Seven Network, on 19 July 2015. It was the only season to be hosted by Shane Bourne, following the decision of former host Daniel MacPherson not to return to the role, instead focusing on his acting career. Edwina Bartholomew returned as co-host. Todd McKenney, Helen Richey and Kym Johnson returned as judges. Adam Garcia did not return due to his wife's pregnancy. Bruno Tonioli served as a special guest judge from Weeks 1-3.

On 7 September 2015, television and radio presenter, Emma Freedman and her partner, Aric Yegudkin, defeated Olympic diver, Matthew Mitcham and his partner, Masha Belash and My Kitchen Rules contestant, Ash Pollard and her partner, Jarryd Byrne.

Couples 
News Corp revealed the first celebrity joining the cast as Olympian Matthew Mitcham. Model Samantha Harris was confirmed on 17 June 2015.
The whole cast was leaked on June 19, 2015.

Scoring chart

 Red numbers indicate the lowest score for each week
 Green numbers indicate the highest score for each week
 the couple eliminated that week
 the returning couple finishing in the bottom two (or three)
 the winning couple
 the runner-up couple
 the third-place couple

Averages 

In Weeks 1-3, special guest judge Bruno Tonioli was part of the judging panel, and scores were out of 40 instead of 30. The 3 points gained by winning the "Dance Off" challenge are not included.

Highest and lowest scoring performances 
The best and worst performances in each dance according to the judges' 30-point scale are as follows:

Couples' highest and lowest scoring dances

According to the traditional 30-point scale:

Weekly scores
Unless indicated otherwise, individual judges scores in the charts below (given in parentheses) are listed in this order from left to right: Helen Richey, Todd McKenney, Kym Johnson.

Week 1
Individual judges scores in the charts below (given in parentheses) are listed in this order from left to right: Todd McKenney, Helen Richey, Kym Johnson, Bruno Tonioli.
Running order

Week 2
Individual judges scores in the charts below (given in parentheses) are listed in this order from left to right: Todd McKenney, Helen Richey, Kym Johnson, Bruno Tonioli.
Running order

Week 3
Individual judges scores in the charts below (given in parentheses) are listed in this order from left to right: Todd McKenney, Helen Richey, Kym Johnson, Bruno Tonioli.
Running order

 a. Giselle Peacock, who previously partnered John Paul Young, stepped in for Tim's regular partner, Camille, after Camille became injured during the rehearsal week.

Week 4

Running order

Week 5

Running order

For each dance-off, the couple with the highest remaining score (the first team listed) picked the opponent against whom they wanted to dance; the chosen opponent was allowed to pick the dance style (from cha-cha-cha, foxtrot and salsa). The winner of each dance-off earned three points. The winning immunity couple were Emma & Aric, whom didn’t have to participate in the dance-off.

Week 6

Running order

Week 7

Running order

Week 8: Grand Final

Night 1
Running order

Night 2
Running order

Dance chart 
The celebrities and professional partners danced one of these routines for each corresponding week:
 Week 1: Cha-cha-cha, Jive, Contemporary, Viennese Waltz, Foxtrot or Tango
 Week 2: Memorable Moments Week - Samba, Rumba, Waltz, Salsa and Paso Doble introduced.
 Week 3: Rio Week - Argentine Tango introduced
 Week 4: One unlearned dance - Quickstep introduced
 Week 5: One unlearned dance - Immunity challenge & Dance-Off
 Week 6: Quarter Final - Australia's Choice Week & Boys vs Girls Team Dance
 Week 7: Semi Final - Fusion Dance & One unlearned dance
 Week 8: Grand Final - Night 1 (Top 4 perform) - Two unlearned dances - Jazz introduced, Night 2 (Top 3 perform) - Judge's Choice and Freestyle

 Highest scoring dance
 Lowest scoring dance
 Not performed or scored
 Won Immunity challenge
 Won Dance Off
 Lost Dance Off

Ratings
 Colour key:
  – Highest rating episode and week during the series
  – Lowest rating episode and week during the series

References

Season 15
2015 Australian television seasons